Montague Street may be:

 Montague Street, London, England
 Montague Street, Melbourne, Australia; noted for the Montague Street Bridge